Time in Tanzania is given by a single time zone, officially denoted as East Africa Time (EAT; UTC+03:00). Tanzania does not observe daylight saving time.

IANA time zone database 
In the IANA time zone database, Tanzania is given one zone in the file zone.tab – Africa/Dar es Salaam, which is an alias to Africa/Nairobi. "TZ" refers to the country's ISO 3166-1 alpha-2 country code. Data for Tanzania directly from zone.tab of the IANA time zone database; columns marked with * are the columns from zone.tab itself:

See also 
Time in Africa
List of time zones by country
List of UTC time offsets

References

External links 
Current time in Tanzania at Time.is
Time in Tanzania at TimeAndDate.com

Time in Tanzania